The Midwest Gaming Classic (MGC) is an annual trade show open to the general public celebrating all forms of gaming, including video games, arcade games, pinball, TTRPG, Tabletop board games, trading and collectible card games with a focus on retrogaming.

The event has been held in several locations in Wisconsin since launching in 2001.

History 
The event that became the Midwest Gaming Classic was first held on June 30, 2001 as Jagfest 2K1. It was the 5th US show titled Jagfest dedicated to the ongoing fan base and homebrew scene of the Atari Jaguar. In 2001 the show organizers decided to open it to all consoles in an effort to expand attendance and be more inclusive. The show expanded to include a museum area, and started a tradition of having consoles and computers on display playable by show attendees, as well as gaming competitions held on multiple platforms. That first year had 15 tables and 20 games available to play. By 2015, it had grown to over 1,000 playable games. 
As the event has grown the venue has changed to accommodate its size, and its continued evolution to include more types of games like pinball (2002), arcade games (2003), board games (2011), claw crane games (2015), air hockey (2018) Magic:_The_Gathering (2019), and LARP and foam weapons (2023).

Events 
The Midwest Gaming Classic had a focus on retrogaming, but has grown to cover modern game systems as well. The devices on display range from the newest gaming devices to some of the oldest, such as the original Pong. The event also attracts video game champions from the past. The event is known for its pinball games, gaming museum and modern game tournaments. It also has a display of gaming systems that never had success due to a superior competitor or change in technology. Nearly all game systems on display can be played by attendees.

Growth History

References

External links
Midwest Gaming Classic - official site.

Recurring events established in 2001
Video game trade shows
Video gaming in the United States